Stefan Otulakowski (born 28 August 1945) is a Polish field hockey player. He competed in the men's tournament at the 1972 Summer Olympics.

References

External links
 

1945 births
Living people
Polish male field hockey players
Olympic field hockey players of Poland
Field hockey players at the 1972 Summer Olympics
Sportspeople from Poznań